The Polish Ice Hockey Federation is the governing body that oversees ice hockey in Poland. Founded in Warsaw on February 22, 1925 by representatives of the 4 Polish hockey clubs: Polonia Warsaw, AZS Warszawa, Warszawianka Warszawa and Warszawskie Towarzystwo Łyżwiarskie (WTŁ Warszawa).

National teams

Men 
 Men's national ice hockey team
 Men's national under 20 ice hockey team
 Men's national under 18 ice hockey team

Women 
 Women's national ice hockey team
 Women's national under 18 ice hockey team

Teams (2016-17)

Polska Hokej Liga 
 Polonia Bytom
 ComArch Cracovia
 Stoczniowiec Gdańsk
 JKH GKS Jastrzębie
 GKS Katowice
 Podhale Nowy Targ
 Orlik Opole
 Unia Oświęcim
 SMS I PZHL Sosnowiec
 Nesta Mires Toruń
 GKS Tychy

Polish 1. Liga 
 Hokej Poznań
 Naprzód Janów
 SMS U18 Sosnowiec
 UKH Dębica
 Zagłębie Sosnowiec

Polish 2. Liga North 
 KH Warsaw Capitals 
 Malgips Dragons Gdańsk 
 Oliwa Hockey Team 
 ŁKH Łódź 
 Mad Dogs Sopot
 BKS Bydgoszcz 
 Hokej Poznań

Polish 2. Liga South 
 WTH Wrocław  
 Orlik II Opole 
 STH Tychy Wolves
 KS Sigma Katowice
 KS Niespełnieni Oświęcim 
 TMH Polonia II Bytom 
 HK Zagłębie II Sosnowiec 
 Gazda KH Podhale Nowy Targ

Polish 3. Liga 
 PTH Poznań 
 Mamuty Poznań 
 KH Wilki Śrem 
 Hockey Club Poznań 
 WTH Września 
 OKH Orły Oleśnica

Other Teams 
 PPWSZ Podhale (EUHL)
 KTH Krynica (temporarily inactive)
 Legia Warsawa (temporarily inactive)
 STS Sanok (temporarily inactive)

Presidents of the Federation 
 Wacław Znajdowski (1925–1928)
 Stanisław Polakiewicz (1928–1932)
 Leon Chrzanowski (1932–1935)
 Witold Hulanicki (1935–1937)
 Piotr Kurnicki (1937–1938)
 Stanisław Burhardt-Bukacki (1938–1939)
 Andrzej Osiecimski-Czapski (1945–1946)
 Mieczysław Boczar (1946–1951)
 Mieczysław Rudziński (1951–1953)
 Stefan Rzeszot (1953–1955)
 Michał Doroszewski (1955–1957)
 Tadeusz Wasilewski (1957–1968)
 Zdzisław Wierzbicki (1968–1973)
 Jan Kania (1973–1975)
 Wiesław Witczak (1975–1980)
 Eugeniusz Adamski (1980–1984)
 Jan Rodzoń (1984–1992)
 Bogdan Tyszkiewicz (1992–2000)
 Zenon Hajduga (2000–2008)
 Zdzisław Ingielewicz (2008–2012)
 Piotr Hałasik (2012–2014)
 Dawid Chwałka (2014 – )

External links 
 
 Poland at IIHF.com

Ice hockey in Poland
Ice Hockey
International Ice Hockey Federation members
Ice hockey governing bodies in Europe
Sports organizations established in 1925
1925 establishments in Poland